The SMMCore standard (Singapore Multimedia Metadata Set) is the national metadata standard used for B2B content exchange in Singapore. In 2008, seeing a need for the adoption of best practices and standards for managing the storage of digital content through a set of metadata frameworks, Infocomm Development Authority of Singapore (IDA) organized an industry roundtable where Mediacorp chaired the Metadata Standardization Subgroup, working with other industry providers, such as Disney and Ascent Media, to define a set of practices for metadata used in the local media industry. Initially, SMMCore was built on the foundation of PBCore. However, with its second revision in 2011, harmonization work has been carried out with the European Broadcasting Union (EBU), where the SMMCore framework has been revised to be built on the foundation of the EBU Core. Harmonization allows for support from a larger metadata community of people versed in the field, access to knowledge on semantic web and linked data for which EBU and therefore SMM Core are ready, adoption by the industry, sharing resources in research, development, and maintenance of the metadata specifications.

Scope 
The subgroup identifies seven groups of first-level elements, which are:

 Identifier group – e.g., 
 Title group – e.g., 
 Description group – e.g., 
 Audience group – e.g.,  (genre, rating)
 Rights group – e.g., 
 Instantiation group – e.g., 
 Others group – e.g., 

A common library of basic attributes groups and derived data types are defined as well.

Methodology 
The subgroup adopted the approach of identifying the market participants and their transactional requirements gathered from a survey conducted, and then using an established standard as a baseline to get started.

See also 
 Dublin core
 PBCore

References

External links 
 EBUCore
 EBUCore specification
 SMMCORE and EBUCore
 ETS metadata

Internet in Singapore